The Frederick Ayer Mansion is a National Historic Landmark on 395 Commonwealth Avenue in the Back Bay neighborhood of Boston, Massachusetts.

The mansion was the home of Frederick Ayer, owner of the American Woolen Company, and features well preserved design work by Louis Comfort Tiffany.  The house was added to the National Register of Historic Places in 2005.

Historical significance
The Ayer Mansion was built in 1900, designed by Louis Comfort Tiffany in a partnership with Alfred J. Manning. It is one of three surviving examples of Tiffany designed interiors. The other two sites are the Samuel L. Clemens (Mark Twain House) in Hartford, Connecticut (1881), and the Ferry House in Seattle, Washington (1903–1906). What makes the Ayer Mansion so unusual is that Tiffany also designed exterior mosaics for the property. The only other building known to have included this feature by Tiffany was his private residence, Laurelton Hall, which was destroyed in a fire in the 1950s. Individual components from Laurelton Hall survive in museums, but the Ayer Mansion is now the only place that has intact in situ interior and exterior components designed by Tiffany.

The mansion was sold by the family after Frederick's death in 1918 and converted to office space. The Trimount Foundation and Bayridge Residence and Cultural Center, affiliates of the Roman Catholic Opus Dei organization, purchased the Ayer mansion and adjacent buildings in 1964.  They are currently operated as private residential facilities for area college students, although tours are occasionally given of the public spaces where Tiffany-designed elements have been preserved.

Preservation
Since its purchase by the Trimount and Bayridge Residence and Cultural Center, several renovations have been done to the buildings. The first renovation occurred in 1971–72 when the two buildings were joined. In 1999, Jean Carroon Architects conducted an assessment of the building's preservation needs as well as detailed proposal on how to achieve it. The first of the projects outlined was the restoration of a 24-foot lay light which had been concealed for fifty years. Also renovated was the front living room in 2000. The drop ceiling installed when the building was converted into offices was removed to reveal the original floral-patterned ceiling, and the parquet floor was also restored. The mosaic on the interior hall was restored in 2002.

Currently, efforts are being made to restore the exterior of the building. The project will include repairing 4 out of the 7 mosaics on the exterior balcony which have been damaged or lost due to water infiltration; recreation of the two missing stained glass screens on the first floor; restoration of the remaining window on the first floor; and recreation of the missing stained glass screen along the top floor.

See also
List of National Historic Landmarks in Boston
National Register of Historic Places listings in northern Boston, Massachusetts

References

External links
National Register Listing information
Registration Form

National Historic Landmarks in Boston
Houses in Boston
Houses completed in 1900
American Woolen Company
Historic district contributing properties in Massachusetts
Houses on the National Register of Historic Places in Suffolk County, Massachusetts
National Register of Historic Places in Boston